The Severin doctrine (Severin v. United States Court of Claims, 1943. 99 Ct.Cl. 435) states that a general contractor cannot sue the US Government on behalf of one of its subcontractors to recover monies due to the subcontractor unless the general contractor is itself liable to the subcontractor.

Plaintiffs therefore had the burden of proving, not that someone suffered actual damages from the defendant's breach of contract, but that they, plaintiffs, suffered actual damages.

See also
United States v. Spearin

References

Contract case law